is a retired Japanese wrestler. He competed in the Greco-Roman bantamweight event at the 1960 and 1964 Olympics and finished in seventh and first place, respectively. Earlier in 1962 he won the world championships and Asian Games in the same event.

References

External links

1940 births
Living people
Olympic wrestlers of Japan
Wrestlers at the 1960 Summer Olympics
Wrestlers at the 1964 Summer Olympics
Japanese male sport wrestlers
Olympic gold medalists for Japan
Olympic medalists in wrestling
Asian Games medalists in wrestling
Wrestlers at the 1962 Asian Games
World Wrestling Championships medalists
Medalists at the 1964 Summer Olympics
Asian Games gold medalists for Japan
Kansai University alumni
Medalists at the 1962 Asian Games
20th-century Japanese people